Andy Murray is a professional tennis player who has been ranked world number 1 for 41 weeks. He is the only player, male or female, to win two Olympic gold medals in singles, which he did at the 2012 and 2016 Summer Olympics. He has reached eleven grand slam finals in total, winning the 2016 Wimbledon Championships, 2013 Wimbledon Championships and the 2012 US Open, and finished as runner-up at the 2008 US Open, the 2010, 2011, 2013, 2015 and 2016 Australian Open, at Wimbledon in 2012 and the 2016 French Open.

Murray made his professional tennis debut on the main tour in Barcelona in 2005. Murray has won 46 singles titles. This includes three Grand Slam titles, 14 Masters 1000 Series titles (the fifth-most since 1990), two gold medals at the Olympics, and a title at the ATP Finals. He also has two exhibition titles, two doubles titles with his brother Jamie Murray and an Olympic silver medal in the mixed doubles with Laura Robson.

Below is a list of career achievements and titles won by Andy Murray.

Career achievements
Murray reached his first Major semi-final and final at the 2008 US Open, where he lost in the final to Roger Federer in straight sets. He reached his second Major final at the 2010 Australian Open, again losing to Federer in straight sets. At the 2011 Australian Open, Murray's third Major final appearance ended in another straight sets defeat, this time at the hands of Novak Djokovic. He made his fourth appearance in a Major final at the 2012 Wimbledon Championships, becoming the first male British player since Bunny Austin in 1938 to make it to a Wimbledon final. He lost to Federer, who recovered from losing the first set to prevail in four sets. This meant that Murray matched Ivan Lendl's record of losing his first four Major finals.

A month after this defeat, however, at the same venue, Murray won the gold medal at the 2012 London Olympics, defeating Federer in three sets in the final, losing only 7 games.  This was Murray's first victory over Federer in the best of five sets format. Later the same day, he and Laura Robson won the silver medal in the mixed doubles. In his fifth Major final appearance, at the 2012 US Open, he defeated Djokovic in five sets. By winning his first Major final at the fifth attempt, he again emulated his coach Ivan Lendl, who also needed five Major final appearances to win his maiden Grand Slam tournament. His victory over Djokovic took four hours and fifty-four minutes, equal to the 1988 US Open final between Ivan Lendl and Mats Wilander as the longest U.S. Open singles final in terms of time.

In addition, Murray has appeared in 21 Masters 1000 Series finals, winning 14. He qualified for the ATP World Tour Finals every year from 2008 to 2016, with his best result coming in the 2016 event in which he went undefeated in round-robin play and then defeated Milos Raonic in the semi-finals. En route to the final, he played the two longest 3-set matches in the event's history against Kei Nishikori and Raonic. In the final he defeated Djokovic in straight sets to clinch his first World Tour Finals crown, as well as the year-end No. 1 ranking.

Murray has lost 25 finals in his career, of which 17 were against the other members of the Big Four (Djokovic 11, Federer 5, Rafael Nadal 1). Between August 2010 when he lost to Sam Querrey, and August 2016 when he lost to Marin Čilić in the Cincinnati Masters, Murray's final losses all came against one of the Big Four. Additionally, in all but one of Murray's eleven grand slam finals, his opponent has been either Djokovic (7 times) or Federer (3 times) – the exception being the most recent, his win over Raonic at Wimbledon in 2016. Murray has taken 12 wins over #1-ranked players: 3 against Nadal, 4 against Federer, and 5 against Djokovic. He has won 11 out of 21 grand-slam semi-finals, with all but two of his defeats at that stage (the first in 2009 and the most recent in 2017) coming against Nadal, Federer or Djokovic.

Murray's 11 grand slam singles finals is the ninth best total of the Open Era.  He is in the top 10 for most match wins at three of the four grand slams (5th at the Australian Open with 51 wins, 6th at Wimbledon with 60 wins, and 9th at the US Open with 48 wins). In Masters 1000 events (going back to 1990), his 14 titles rank him 5th overall. His win at the 2016 Paris Masters 1000 event was his 8th Tour title of the season and means that he has won 7 of the 9 different Masters 1000 events (missing Indian Wells and Monte Carlo).

Performance timelines

Singles
Current after the 2023 Indian Wells Masters.

Doubles

Mixed doubles

Grand Slam finals

Singles: 11 (3 titles, 8 runner-ups)

Other significant finals

Year–End Championships

Singles: 1 (1 title)

ATP Masters 1000 finals

Singles: 21 (14 titles, 7 runner-ups)

Doubles: 1 (1 runner-up)

Olympic medal matches

Singles: 2 (2 gold medals)

Mixed Doubles: 1 (1 silver medal)

Team competitions finals

ATP career finals

Singles: 71 (46 titles, 25 runner-ups)

Doubles: 5 (3 titles, 2 runner-ups)

ATP Challengers and ITF Futures finals

Singles: 8 (7 titles, 1 runner-up)

Doubles: 1 (1 runner-up)

ATP ranking

Andy Murray has spent in total 41 consecutive weeks as ATP world No. 1, from November 7, 2016 to August 20, 2017.

*.

Head-to-head records

Record against top-10 players

Murray's match record against those who have been ranked in the top 10, with those who are active in boldface.

Record against players ranked No. 11–20

Active players are in boldface. 

 Feliciano López 11–0
 Viktor Troicki 8–0
 Andreas Seppi 8–1
 Sam Querrey 8–2
 Ivo Karlović 7–0
 Juan Ignacio Chela 7–1
 Marcel Granollers 7–1
 Paul-Henri Mathieu 6–0
 Nick Kyrgios 6–1
 Jarkko Nieminen 5–0
 Bernard Tomic 5–0
 Dmitry Tursunov 5–0
 Philipp Kohlschreiber 5–1
 Alexandr Dolgopolov 4–0
 Xavier Malisse 4–0
 Jerzy Janowicz 4–1
 Nikoloz Basilashvili 3–0
 Pablo Cuevas 3–0
 Robby Ginepri 3–0
 Max Mirnyi 3–0
 Benoît Paire 3–0
 Kyle Edmund 3–1
 Florian Mayer 3–1
 Andrei Pavel 2–0
 Fabrice Santoro 2–0
 Frances Tiafoe 2–1
 Borna Ćorić 2–2
 José Acasuso 1–0
 Stefan Koubek 1–0
 Reilly Opelka 1–0
 Guido Pella 1–0
 Albert Ramos Viñolas 1–1
 Dominik Hrbatý 0–1
 Aslan Karatsev 0–1
 Alex de Minaur 0–2

*

Wins over top ranked players

Wins over top ranked opposition
Murray has a  record against players who were, at the time the match was played, top ranked player, or if he was world No. 1 himself, then the highest ranked player other than himself which is the world No. 2.

Top-10 wins

Murray has a  record against players who were, at the time the match was played, ranked in the top 10. Murray has 12 wins over No. 1-ranked players, beating Djokovic 5 times, Federer 4 times and Nadal 3 times.

Career Grand Slam tournament seedings

The tournaments won by Murray are in boldface.

*

ATP Tour career earnings

* Statistics correct .

Olympics
Murray represented Great Britain at his maiden Olympics in Beijing 2008. He competed in the singles and doubles competitions. Despite being seeded sixth in the singles competition, he was eliminated in the first round by Chinese Taipei's Yen-hsun Lu. Along with his brother Jamie, he advanced to the second round of the doubles competition with a win over the Canadian pairing of Daniel Nestor and Frédéric Niemeyer. The Murray brothers were eliminated in the second round by France's Arnaud Clément and Michael Llodra. In February, Murray pulled out of the Davis Cup tie against Argentina, because of a knee injury, so Argentina thrashed the under-strength British team. Jamie Murray scathingly criticised Andy and they did not speak to each other for a fortnight. Their rift continued in the Olympic doubles, over a perceived lack of effort from Andy.

At the London 2012 Olympics, Murray competed in the singles, doubles (partnering his brother Jamie) and mixed doubles (partnering Laura Robson). In the singles, he won the gold medal, including straight-set victories over Novak Djokovic in the semifinals and Roger Federer in the final, four weeks after Federer had beaten him in on the same court in the Wimbledon final. He also won the silver medal in the mixed doubles, losing to the Belarusian pairing of Max Mirnyi and Victoria Azarenka.

Murray was the Great Britain flag bearer during the opening ceremony for the 2016 Summer Olympics. He reached the gold medal match in the singles competition, whilst losing in the first and second rounds of the men's doubles and mixed doubles competitions respectively. After a 4-hour final, Murray defeated Juan Martín del Potro and successfully retained his title as Olympic champion, achieving a second Olympic gold medal – a feat which no other male singles player has achieved. Murray attributed the motivation of his win as coming from Mo Farah's 10,000 m win.

Davis Cup

Year by year

2005
Murray made his Davis Cup debut for Great Britain in the Europe/Africa Zone Group 1 2nd Round against Israel in 2005 at 17 years of age, the youngest ever player for Great Britain. He teamed up with fellow debutant David Sherwood and came out victorious in the crucial doubles rubber against the experienced Jonathan Erlich and Andy Ram, helping Britain advance 3–2.

In September, Murray played his debut singles match for the Davis Cup in the World Group Play-off against Switzerland in Geneva on clay with Greg Rusedski, Alan Mackin and David Sherwood. Captain Jeremy Bates surprised everyone by naming Murray as the British No 1 and Alan Mackin as British No 2. Under the Davis Cup rules, this meant that for Friday's singles, Murray played the Swiss No 2, Stan Wawrinka while Mackin played the Swiss No 1, Roger Federer. Bates opted for this line-up believed that Federer was virtually unbeatable because he was on a winning streak and hadn't lost since June, and consequently Britain gambled on beating Wawrinka twice, with Murray playing Wawrinka on Friday when he was freshest. Under the rules for the Sunday reverse singles, he would have been able to substitute Mackin with Greg Rusedski, so that Rusedski would play Wawrinka, while Murray played Federer. However Great Britain lost both of their Friday rubbers, giving Switzerland a 2–0 lead. In the doubles, Murray/Rusedski played Federer and Yves Allegro. The British tactics came to nought as Switzerland won the doubles rubber as well, gaining an unassailable 3–0 lead after two days. Alan Mackin and David Sherwood were consequently nominated for the dead singles rubbers losing both of them, resulting in a clean sweep for Switzerland.

2006
For the Europe/Africa Zone Group I tie against Serbia and Montenegro, Murray had been suffering with a bacterial infection, so he was restricted to playing the doubles alongside Greg Rusedski, which they lost. With Arvind Parmar also losing in the singles, Great Britain were beaten 3–2.

In the same week as the relegation 1st round play-off against Israel, Murray was officially entered for the ATP tournament in Indianapolis, sparking fears about his commitment. There was a controversial move by the Lawn Tennis Association to pay £500,000 towards the cost of Murray's next coach, Brad Gilbert as a way of securing Murray's long-term services for the Davis Cup team.
In the event, Murray played, winning his first singles. However he lost the doubles with Jamie Delgado, during which Murray damaged his shoulder and neck. He was diagnosed with whiplash, causing him to sit out the final day's singles, and eventually Great Britain were beaten 3–2 to proceed to the relegation 2nd round play-off against Ukraine. With Murray and Greg Rusedski playing, Great Britain beat Ukraine 3–2, to stay in Group I.

2007
In the tie against the Netherlands, Murray and Tim Henman won the opening singles, then Jamie Murray and Greg Rusedski won the doubles to secure victory. Rusedski announced his retirement on the doubles court.

In the run up to World Group play-off against Croatia, Tim Henman had announced he would retire after this match. Murray said "I'm not going to want to let the team down or let Tim down, I'd feel terrible if I was the one that was responsible for losing Tim's last tie. This means a lot to me and it's definitely going to be the biggest Davis Cup match of my career.". "Everyone is going to want to win for Tim. I'm hoping the way I play will show him what his career meant to my development and me." Great Britain beat Croatia 4–1 to qualify for the World Group in 2008.

After the retirement of Tim Henman and Greg Rusedski, the Davis Cup team was now dependent on Murray having to win three matches, though Henman had told him how wearing and time-consuming that can be. While the LTA was funding Brad Gilbert, Murray was obligated to play for his country, but in November, Murray finished with Brad Gilbert as his coach.

2008
Murray skipped the World Group 1st round tie against Argentina, over fears he could exacerbate a knee injury, leaving the British team in a hopeless situation – they lost 4–1. Jamie was furious that Andy was letting them down and the Murrays would not speak to each other for two weeks. Seven months later, as the brothers prepared for the tie against Austria, Andy declared that he had healed the rift with Jamie. When Jamie Murray and Ross Hutchins were beaten in the doubles, John Lloyd suffered criticism for not playing Andy. Great Britain lost their World Group play-off to Austria 3–2 and were relegated to Europe/Africa Zone Group I.

2009
Murray withdrew from the tie against Ukraine after failing to shake off a virus, and Great Britain lost 4–1.

Murray suffered an injury to his left wrist at the US Open, and would have rested if his next event had not been the Davis Cup. At the Poland match, he won both his singles rubbers. For the doubles with Ross Hutchins, Murray began in the right-hand court, the side usually occupied by the less dominant partner, so as to afford more protection to his troublesome left wrist than when striking double-handed backhands from the left court., though allowed his partner to resume his usual role in the second set. However, the pair succumbed to the world-class Polish duo, and Poland won 3–2;Great Britain were relegated to Europe/Africa Zone Group II for the first time since 1996. Murray had aggravated his wrist injury, so couldn't play for another six weeks.

2010
Murray pulled out of the match against Lithuania, so younger players could gain more international experience, and to allow him to focus on trying to win Grand Slam titles. His absence was criticised by Davis Cup captain John Lloyd. The Lithuanian side entered the tie as underdogs; fielding a team of teenagers, but Lithuania won 3–2. This was the first time that Great Britain had lost five ties in a row and was described as a humiliating Davis Cup defeat for Great Britain. It led to the resignation of John Lloyd as Davis Cup captain, with Britain now threatened with relegation to the lowest tier of the competition.

2011
Murray returned for the Europe/Africa Zone Group II tie versus Luxembourg. He beat Laurent Bram, a tennis coach, 6–0, 6–0, 6–0, the last time a Briton had achieved this score line in Davis Cup was Alan Mills defeating Josef Offenheim in 1959, also against Luxembourg. Andy and Jamie Murray teamed up for the first time in Davis Cup doubles for a straight sets win. In his second singles match, Andy then recorded a third straight sets victory, over No. 81 Gilles Müller, with Great Britain eventually winning 4–1.

Three of Hungary's top four players were not available for the Great Britain vs Hungary tie, so Murray defeated Sebő Kiss, a law student without a ranking, in his first singles rubber. Earlier, James Ward overcame sickness to beat the Hungarian No 1, then Colin Fleming and Ross Hutchins won the doubles, and Great Britain was promoted into Europe/Africa Zone Group I for the first time since 2009.

Afterwards, Murray criticised the tournament schedule and cast doubt on his availability for next year's Davis Cup.

2012
Murray intended to play in the Europe/Africa Zone Group I tie against Slovakia, but was prevented by injury concerns after the Australian Open. In any event, Great Britain won 3–2.

2013
By 2013, Great Britain's other tennis players had earned the team a chance to return to the World Group. Murray was suffering a vulnerable back and intended to have surgery after the US Open. Murray revealed that the fear of being branded "unpatriotic" led him to delay the surgery until after the Davis Cup tie in Croatia in September, which jeopardised his place in the next Australian Open. With Croatia's No 1 Marin Čilić absent for committing a doping offence, Murray won both his singles matches and the doubles with Colin Fleming, Great Britain eventually winning 4–1, for their first victory on clay since Ukraine in 2006, and returning to the World Group for the first time since 2008.

2014
At the World Group first round tie against the United States in San Diego, Murray defeated Donald Young and James Ward unexpectedly beat Sam Querrey on the first day. On the last day, Murray beat Sam Querrey to put Great Britain into the quarterfinals of the Davis Cup for the first time since 1986. Britain's only previous victory on American soil was 111 years ago.

Murray had to recover from a virus to play in the Quarter Final tie against Italy in Naples after missing the Thursday draw ceremony. James Ward lost his rain delayed match, while Murray's match against Andreas Seppi was halted on Friday evening due to fading light with the score at one set and 5–5 to Murray. On Saturday morning, Murray finished his match, winning in three sets. Two hours later, Murray partnered Colin Fleming to win the doubles rubber. Murray had only beaten one top ten player on clay, Nikolay Davydenko, back in 2009, and was upset by No. 13 Fabio Fognini in straight sets, which took Great Britain to the deciding final rubber. However, James Ward was defeated by Andreas Seppi, also in straight sets, knocking Great Britain out of the Davis Cup.

2015
Murray helped lead Great Britain to the final of the World Group for the first time since 1978, winning both his singles rubbers in the matches against the US, France and Australia.

In the final against Belgium in Ghent, Murray beat Ruben Bemelmans and combined with brother Jamie to win the doubles rubber before defeating David Goffin to win the Davis Cup for Great Britain, 79 years after the national team's last win.

2016
Murray led Britain against Japan in the first World Group match in Birmingham, before sitting out the quarter final in Belgrade against Serbia which fell just after Wimbledon. He returned for the semifinal against Argentina, where Great Britain lost.

2019
In his only match in this year's Davis Cup, Murray defeated the Netherlands' Tallon Griekspoor in the group stages against the Netherlands.

2022
Murray competed in two doubles matches and one singles match for Great Britain in this year's Davis Cup Finals. Partnered with Joe Salisbury, they lost to the United States' Rajeev Ram and Jack Sock, and the Netherlands' Wesley Koolhof and Matwé Middelkoop. Both matches were the deciding factor in each tie, which Great Britain lost 2-1. Great Britain therefore did not qualify for the quarterfinals. Murray then took part in his only singles match this year, against Kazakhstan, where he was victorious.

Participations (41–10)

   indicates the outcome of the Davis Cup match followed by the score, date, place of event, the zonal classification and its phase, and the court surface.

Notable exhibitions

Singles finals: 4 (2 titles, 2 runner-up)

Team competitions

See also

List of career achievements by Andy Murray
Open Era tennis records – men's singles
All-time tennis records - men's singles
 List of Grand Slam men's singles champions
List of ATP number 1 ranked singles tennis players
List of highest ranked tennis players per country
List of flag bearers for Great Britain at the Olympics
2016 Summer Olympics national flag bearers
Sport in Great Britain
Big Four career statistics

References

External links 
 
 Andy Murray at the ITF profile
 

Andy Murray
Andy Murray tennis seasons
Murray, Andy